Puerto nuevo (English: New Port) is a 1936 Argentine tango musical film drama film directed and written by Luis César Amadori and Mario Soffici. The music was performed by Uruguayan musician Francisco Canaro. Club Atlético Puerto Nuevo, founded in 1939, takes its name from the film.

Main cast
Pepe Arias
Alicia Vignoli
Charlo
Sofía Bozán
José Gola
Juan Siches de Alarcón
Haydee Bozán
Miguel Gómez Bao

References

External links

1936 films
Argentine musical drama films
1930s Spanish-language films
Argentine black-and-white films
Tango films
Films directed by Mario Soffici
Films directed by Luis César Amadori
1930s musical drama films
1930s dance films
1936 drama films
1930s Argentine films